Roisin McGettigan (born 23 August 1980 in Wicklow, Ireland) is an Irish runner who specializes in the 3000 metres steeplechase. She graduated from Providence College in 2003. She competed in her first Olympic Games in 2008 in Beijing. After finishing second in her qualifying heat in the 3000 m steeplechase, she finished 14th in the final.

In 2014, McGettigan was retroactively awarded the bronze medal for the 2009 European Athletics Indoor Championships 1500 metres race. The winner of that race, Anna Alminova of Russia, had all her results since February 2009 cancelled due to irregularities in her biological passport.

McGettigan and runner Lauren Fleshman co-created "Believe I Am", a company which brings sports psychology techniques used by pro athletes to women through apparel and training journals.

International competitions

Personal bests

1500 metres - 4:10.34 min (2003)
Mile run - 4:30.06  min (2009)
3000 metres - 9:03 min (2005)
3000 metres steeplechase - 9:28.29 min (2007)
5000 metres - 15:57.91 min (2008)

References

Profile

1980 births
20th-century Irish people
21st-century Irish people
Living people
Irish female long-distance runners
Sportspeople from Dublin (city)
Athletes (track and field) at the 2008 Summer Olympics
Olympic athletes of Ireland
Providence College alumni
Irish female steeplechase runners
World Athletics Championships athletes for Ireland
Irish female middle-distance runners